Milan Pepić (born ) is a Serbian male volleyball player.

Clubs
 OK Student Pale (2004–2005)
 OK Modriča (2005–2007)
 MOK Osijek (2007–2008)
 OK Prvačina (2008–2010)
 Gumi KB Insurance Stars (2010–2012)
 Osaka Blazers Sakai (2012–present)

References

1984 births
Living people
Bosnia and Herzegovina men's volleyball players
Gumi KB Insurance Stars players
Osaka Blazers Sakai players
Sportspeople from Tuzla
Serbs of Bosnia and Herzegovina